Donald P. Scott was a 61-year-old man who lived on a ranch in a remote part of Ventura County, California, in the Santa Monica Mountains, who was fatally shot during a police raid on October 2, 1992. The officers were attempting to serve a warrant to search  his ranch for marijuana. When the officers forcibly entered his home, Scott emerged from his bedroom with a revolver because he heard his wife shouting "don't shoot me" and was then shot while lowering his gun as he was ordered to do by police. No marijuana plants or other evidence of drug sales were found on the property. An official inquiry later suggested that the agents hoped they could seize his property by use of asset forfeiture.

The raid
Early on the morning of October 2, 1992, 31 officers from the Los Angeles County Sheriff's Department, Drug Enforcement Administration, Border Patrol, California National Guard and National Park Service entered the  Scott's  ranch. They planned to arrest Scott for allegedly running a 4,000-plant marijuana plantation. When deputies broke down the door to Scott's house, Scott's wife (Frances Plante-Scott) would later tell reporters, she screamed, "Don't shoot me. Don't kill me." That brought Scott staggering out of the bedroom, blurry-eyed from a cataract operation—holding a .38 caliber Colt snub-nosed revolver over his head. When he emerged at the top of the stairs, holding his gun over his head, the officers told him to lower the gun. As he did, they shot him to death.  According to the official report, the gun was pointed at the officers when they shot him.

Later, the lead agent in the case, sheriff's deputy Gary Spencer, and his partner John Cater posed for photographs smiling arm-in-arm outside Scott's cabin.

Despite a subsequent search of Scott's ranch using helicopters, dogs, searchers on foot, and a high-tech Jet Propulsion Laboratory device for detecting trace amounts of sinsemilla, no marijuana—or any other illegal drug—was found.

Aftermath
Scott and his wife, Frances Plante-Scott, had only been married for two months at the time of the incident. His body was cremated and the ashes were given to his widow. The ashes were later destroyed when the ranch home was burned in a wildfire the following year.

Scott's widow, along with four of Scott's children from previous marriages, subsequently filed a $100 million wrongful death suit against the county and federal government. The case lasted eight years, requiring the services of 15 attorneys and some 30 volume binders of court documents. In January 2000, attorneys for Los Angeles County and the federal government agreed to settle with Scott's heirs and estate for $5 million, even though the sheriff's department still maintained its deputies had done nothing wrong.

Michael D. Bradbury, the District Attorney of Ventura County, conducted an investigation into the raid and the aftermath, issuing a report on the events leading up to and on October 2, 1992.  He concluded that asset forfeiture was a motive for the raid.

The Los Angeles County Sheriff's Department issued their own report in response, clearing everyone involved of wrongdoing, while California Attorney General Dan Lungren criticized District Attorney Bradbury.  Sheriff Spencer sued D.A. Bradbury for defamation in response to the report.  The court ruled in favor of Michael Bradbury and ordered Sheriff Spencer to pay $50,000 in Bradbury's legal bills.

See also
Forfeiture Endangers American Rights, a U.S. advocacy organization
List of killings by law enforcement officers in the United States
War on drugs

References

External links
Conspiracy theory in song
F.E.A.R. collection of legal documents detailing the Don Scott case
The Village Voice - The Pot Plot
Donald Scott case - killing for land
Civil asset forfeiture: the looting of America
Gun Control and the War on Drugs

1930s births
1992 deaths
Deaths by firearm in California
People shot dead by law enforcement officers in the United States
Santa Monica Mountains
History of Ventura County, California
Santa Monica Mountains National Recreation Area
October 1992 events in the United States
Law enforcement in California